Justin M. Wilson (born March 11, 1979) is an American politician who has served as Mayor of Alexandria, Virginia since January 2, 2019. He previously served on the Alexandria City Council, including a term as Vice Mayor from 2016 to 2019. He is a member of the Democratic Party.

Biography 
Wilson was born in Cheverly, Maryland and grew up in Washington, D.C. and Fairfax County, Virginia. He graduated from John R. Lewis High School (Springfield, VA) when it was under the name of Robert E. Lee High School and Virginia Commonwealth University. Wilson got his start in politics in the Virginia Young Democrats, and later served as a page for Don Beyer, during Beyer's tenure as Lieutenant Governor of Virginia. He married Alex Crawford-Batt in 2001, three years after meeting at a Democratic state convention while in college.

Wilson was elected to the Alexandria City Council in 2007 but lost his bid for re-election in 2009. He was elected to the council for a second time in the 2012 election, and was re-elected in 2015. As the council member with the highest vote total in the 2015 election, he served as Vice Mayor for the following council term.

In the 2018 Democratic mayoral primary, Wilson defeated incumbent mayor and fellow Democrat Allison Silberberg, by a margin of 52% to 47%. No other candidate qualified for the November general election ballot, so Wilson ran unopposed, although write-in votes were permitted; Wilson received 93% of the votes cast.

In a rematch, Wilson defeated Allison Silberberg in the 2021 Democratic primary, 57% to 43%.

Because Alexandria's mayor serves only part-time, Wilson also works for Amtrak as a senior director of vendor and contract management. He is married with two children.

References

External links 
 City of Alexandria website biography

Living people
People from Cheverly, Maryland
Virginia Commonwealth University alumni
Mayors of Alexandria, Virginia
Virginia Democrats
Virginia city council members
21st-century American politicians
1979 births